ColorZ is an action/puzzle video game for WiiWare by Exkee.

Gameplay
The game is set in a world polluted by microbes of different colors, which the player must clean up by absorbing them into a UFO. Players control up to 3 UFOs colored red, green and blue that individually can only absorb microbes of their own color. However, by fusing together their UFOs, players can absorb other colors based on additive color mixing. For example, to absorb yellow microbes the red and green UFOs must fuse, while a fusion of all three UFOs will allow the player to absorb white microbes. Players must also avoid absorbing the wrong colored microbe with their UFOs. The game also features a co-operative mode for up to three players that sees each player controlling an individual UFO.

The game is controlled with the Wii Remote and Nunchuk in single player, though only the Wii Remote is required in multiplayer.

Development and release
The color matching and absorbing aspects of the game were inspired by the shoot 'em up Ikaruga.

It was released in Europe on July 24, 2009, and in North America on September 7, 2009, followed by the Japan release on November 30, 2010.

Reception

References

External links
Official site

2009 video games
WiiWare games
Wii-only games
Video games about microbes
Video games developed in France
Puzzle video games
Wii games
Cooperative video games
Multiplayer and single-player video games